Rhys Smith  (born 13 March 1997) is an English field hockey player who plays in midfield for Wimbledon and the  England and Great Britain national teams.

He was educated at Whitgift School, South Croydon, London. He completed his higher education at Durham University.

Club career

Smith plays club hockey in the Men's England Hockey League Premier Division for Wimbledon.
He also played for East Grinstead.

International career

He made his senior international debuts in October 2018, for Great Britain v Belgium on 2 October 2018 and for England v France on 16 October 2018.

References

External links
 

1997 births
Living people
English male field hockey players
East Grinstead Hockey Club players
Wimbledon Hockey Club players
Men's England Hockey League players
Alumni of St Mary's College, Durham
Commonwealth Games bronze medallists for England
Commonwealth Games medallists in field hockey
Field hockey players at the 2022 Commonwealth Games
Medallists at the 2022 Commonwealth Games